Frans Ntaole (born 8 August 1950) is a Lesotho long-distance runner. He competed in the marathon at the 1984 Summer Olympics.

References

1950 births
Living people
Athletes (track and field) at the 1984 Summer Olympics
Lesotho male long-distance runners
Lesotho male marathon runners
Olympic athletes of Lesotho
Place of birth missing (living people)